"Love, Truth and Honesty" is a song by English girl group Bananarama from their first greatest hits album, Greatest Hits Collection (1988). It was released on 12 September 1988 as the album's lead single. The song was co-written and produced by the Stock Aitken Waterman (SAW) trio and was the last single Bananarama would write with them as a trio.

It is the only Bananarama single to give a songwriting credit to new member Jacquie O'Sullivan. Speaking of the subject matter of the song, Keren Woodward noted, "The single’s more bitter than it appears on the surface. It’s not Hey! Love, Truth and Honesty!' It’s what a fool I was to believe in love truth and honesty.”

The single peaked at number 23 on the UK Singles Chart, while reaching number one in Finland, as well as the top 20 in Ireland and New Zealand, the top 30 in Switzerland, and the top 40 in Australia. In the United States, "Love, Truth and Honesty" peaked at number 89 on the Billboard Hot 100, marking the group's last appearance on the chart to date.

In 2021, British magazine Classic Pop'' ranked it number 15 in their list of "Top 40 Stock Aitken Waterman songs".

Music video
The accompanying music video, directed by Big TV!, features the trio performing in front of mirrors and neon lights as a well-groomed man looks on. The three members of the band are shown alternately in evening gowns—a departure from their previous looks—as well as more casual black outfits.

Track listings7-inch single"Love, Truth and Honesty" – 3:25
"Strike It Rich" – 5:0312-inch single"Love, Truth and Honesty" (Dance Hall Version) – 7:20
"Strike It Rich" (Full Length Club Mix) – 5:5512-inch single (The Remixes)"Love, Truth and Honesty" (Balearacidic Mix) – 8:20
"Love, Truth and Honesty" (Hot Power 12″) – 9:15
"Strike It Rich" – 2:15US 12-inch single"Love, Truth and Honesty" (Hot Power Mix) – 9:24
"Love, Truth and Honesty" (Hot Power Edit) – 3:30
"Love, Truth and Honesty" (Dance Hall Version) – 7:20
"Strike It Rich" (Full Length Club Mix) – 5:58UK and German CD maxi single'''
"Love, Truth and Honesty" (Dance Hall Version) – 7:25
"Strike It Rich" (Full Length Club Mix) – 5:17
"I Want You Back" – 3:49
"Love, Truth and Honesty" – 3:25

Charts

References

1988 singles
1988 songs
Bananarama songs
London Records singles
Music videos directed by Big T.V.
Number-one singles in Finland
Song recordings produced by Stock Aitken Waterman
Songs written by Keren Woodward
Songs written by Matt Aitken
Songs written by Mike Stock (musician)
Songs written by Pete Waterman
Songs written by Sara Dallin